Ravenswood was a rapid transit station on the Chicago "L"'s Ravenswood branch, which is now part of the Brown Line. The station opened on May 18, 1907, and was located at Wilson Avenue and Ravenswood Avenue in the Ravenswood neighborhood of Chicago. It was built to serve as a connection point to the Chicago and North Western Railway via their adjacent Ravenswood station. Ravenswood was situated east of Damen and north of Montrose. The station closed on August 1, 1949, along with 23 other stations as part of a CTA service revision.

Station details

Ridership
Station ridership peaked in 1917 at 547,257 passengers. Between 1923 and its closure, Ravenswood was consistently the least-patronized station on the Ravenswood branch. Ridership last exceeded 500,000 passengers in 1928 and 400,000 in 1930. In its last full year of operation, 1948, it served 266,162 riders, a 17.77 percent decline from the 323,689 passengers of 1947. For the part of 1949 it was open, it served 137,193 patrons.

References

Works cited

Defunct Chicago "L" stations
Railway stations in the United States opened in 1907
1907 establishments in Illinois
Railway stations closed in 1949
1949 disestablishments in Illinois